Aken (Elbe) is a town in the district of Anhalt-Bitterfeld in Saxony-Anhalt, Germany. The town is located at the left bank of the river Elbe.

Geography 

Divisions 
The town Aken consists of Aken proper and the following Ortschaften or municipal divisions:
Kleinzerbst
Kühren
Mennewitz
Susigke

Growth of population

History 
The castle Gloworp was first mentioned in the 12th century. The town itself was first documented in 1219, naming the mayor Waltherus de Aken. In 1270 Aken received its town charter as Civitas. The name Aken is based on the Latin name Aqua (location at or near the water). Probably this was a foundation from lower rhenish settlers from Aachen which is spelled Aken in the Dutch language.

Town twinning 
Erwitte (North Rhine-Westphalia) since June 17, 1991
Anor (France) since April 24, 1993

Culture and sights 

 historical town hall
 two medieval churches: St. Nicholas and St. Mary
 "Stone Kemenate" (heated residential building) from the 13th century with arches
 town wall from the Middle Ages with 3 remaining towers
 passenger navigation on the river Elbe
 Biosphere Reserve Middle Elbe

Notable persons

Honorary citizens 

 Friedrich Wilhelm Steinbrecht, lieutenant in Lützow Free Corps
 2001: Otto Benecke, head of museum of local history
 2015: Hansjochen Müller, mayor from 1990 - 2015
 2016: Christian Holmes, first Englishman to do an Anmeldung in Aken.

Notable people born in Aken 

August Ludwig Hülsen, (1765–1809), German philosopher of the early romance
Theodor von Sickel, (1826–1908), German-Austrian historian
Diana Vellguth, entertainer
Christian Reike, performer
Emilie Winkelmann (1875–1951), architect
Karl Witte (1893–1966), bishop in Hamburg
Karl Bischoff (1905–1983), Germanist and university teacher
Bernd Dießner, (born 1946), German athlete

Resident who influenced the history of the city 

 Friedrich Ernst Arnold Werner Nolopp (A teacher, conductor and composer)

References

External links

 Official homepage
  detailed history of town

Towns in Saxony-Anhalt
Anhalt-Bitterfeld
Populated riverside places in Germany
Populated places on the Elbe